The Iranian diaspora refers to Iranian people or those who are of Iranian ancestry living outside Iran.

In 2021, the Ministry of Foreign Affairs of Iran published statistics, which showed that 4,037,258 Iranians are living abroad, an increase from previous years. Many of them live in North America, Europe, the Arab states of the Persian Gulf, Turkey, Azerbaijan, Australia and the broader Middle East. Other studies have estimated about 1.5 million or fewer Iranians living abroad. Many of them migrated to other countries after the Iranian Revolution in 1979.

Statistics by country

Socioeconomic status
Nearly 60 percent of Iranians abroad have earned at least an undergraduate degree, and have one of the highest rates of self-employment among immigrant groups. Many have founded their own companies, including Isaac Larian, the founder of MGA Entertainment, and Pierre Omidyar, who founded eBay in 1995 in San Jose, California. Iranian households earn on average $87,288 annually, and are ranked ninth by income in the United States.

Students abroad

According to the Iranian government, 55,686 Iranian students were studying abroad in 2013: 8,883 studied in Malaysia, 7,341 in the United States, 5,638 in Canada, 3,504 in Germany, 3,364 in Turkey, 3,228 in Britain, and the rest in other countries. The Iranian Ministry of Education estimated that between 350,000 and 500,000 Iranians were studying outside Iran as of 2014.

Politics

  Hrant Markarian, Chairman of Armenian Revolutionary Federation
  Sam Dastyari, Senator
  Seema Kennedy, Member of the House of Commons
  Haleh Afshar, Member of the House of Lords
  David Alliance, Member of the House of Lords
  Amir Khadir, Member of the National Assembly of Quebec
  Reza Moridi, Member of the Legislative Assembly of Ontario
  Majid Jowhari, Member of the Parliament of Canada
  Ali Ehsassi, Member of the Parliament of Canada
  Pouria Amirshahi, Former Member of the French National Assembly
  Mahmoud Khayami, founder of Iran Khodro
  Pierre Omidyar, investigative journalist for Honolulu Civil Beat and First Look Media, also founder of eBay 
  Patrick Ali Pahlavi, member of the Pahlavi dynasty
  Yasmin Fahimi, general secretary of the Social Democratic Party
  Sahra Wagenknecht, Member of the Bundestag and deputy chairperson of the Left Party
  Omid Nouripour, Member of the Bundestag, (Alliance '90/The Greens)
  Moshe Katsav, President of Israel
  Dan Halutz, Chief of General Staff
  Shaul Mofaz, Minister of Defense
  Golriz Ghahraman, Member of New Zealand Parliament from the 52nd New Zealand Parliament part of the Green Party of Aotearoa New Zealand
  Farah Karimi, Member of the House of Representatives
  Mazyar Keshvari, Member of the Storting
  Ardalan Shekarabi, Minister for Public Administration
  Maryam Yazdanfar, Member of the Riksdag
  Reza Khelili Dylami, Member of the Riksdag
  Goli Ameri, Assistant Secretary of State for Educational and Cultural Affairs
  Cyrus Amir-Mokri, Assistant Secretary of the Treasury for Financial Institutions
  Cyrus Habib, Member of the Washington House of Representatives
  Azita Raji, United States Ambassador to Sweden
  Bob Yousefian, Mayor of Glendale
  Jimmy Delshad, Mayor of Beverly Hills

Economics

In 2000, the Iran Press Service reported that Iranian expatriates had invested between $200 and $400 billion in the United States, Europe, and China, but almost nothing in Iran. In Dubai, Iranian expatriates have invested an estimated $200 billion (2006). Migrant Iranian workers abroad remitted less than two billion dollars home in 2006.

High net-worth individuals

Expatriate fund

The fund's stated goal is to attract investment from Iranian expatriates and to use their experience in stimulating foreign investments.

Religious affiliation

The Iranian diaspora has been commonly defined as a largely secular and as cultural or nominal Muslims; the majority of them do not take fundamental Islamic rituals, such as daily prayers or fasting, and having largely embraced Western secularism. Some expatriate Iranians consider themselves irreligious, agnostic, or atheist.

Notes
In the period between 1961 to 2005, the United States became the main destination of Iranian emigrants. An estimated 378,995 Iranians have immigrated to the United States in that period, where Iranian immigrants have primarily immigrated to California (158,613 Iran-born in 2000), New York (17,323), Texas (15,581), Virginia (10,889), and Maryland (9,733). The Los Angeles Metropolitan Area was estimated to be host to approximately 114,712 Iranian immigrants, earning the Westwood area of Los Angeles the nickname Tehrangeles.

The US Census Bureau's decennial census form does not offer a designation for individuals of Iranian descent, and therefore it is estimated that only a fraction of the total number of Iranians are writing in their ancestry. The 2000 Census Bureau estimates that the Iranian American community (including the US-born children of the Iranian foreign born) numbers around 330,000. Studies using alternative statistical methods have estimated the actual number of Iranian Americans in the range of 691,000 to 1.2 million.

See also

Demography of Iran
Foreign relations of Iran
Industrial Development and Renovation Organization of Iran
Iran's brain drain
Iranian nationality law
Tourism in Iran
Visa requirements for Iranian citizens

References

Sources

External links

History of Iranian diaspora - Encyclopædia Iranica
Country Profile - Iran Migration Policy Institute (including modern history of Iranian migration)
Iranian Diaspora in pre-Islamic times
High Council of Iranians Abroad- "Strengthening the national identity of Iranians outside Iran and to defend their rights, helping the propagation of Persian calligraphy and language, and easing the participation in national security."
Iranians Abroad - resources and links parstimes.com
Iranian Alliances Across Borders (IAAB) (non-profit, non-partisan, and non-religious)
Iranian diaspora - press article (2009)
Seminar for Iranians Abroad Held in Tehran on August 2010